Mimeusemia ceylonica is a moth of the family Noctuidae first described by George Hampson in 1893. It is found in Sri Lanka and is known to produce a neurotoxin similar to MDMA.

References

Moths of Asia
Moths described in 1893
Agaristinae